Begum Anowara Sporting Club are a Bangladeshi women's football club based in Dhaka that competes in the Bangladesh Women's Football League, the top flight of women's football in Bangladesh.

History
The Begum Anowara Sporting Club was established on 7 February 2020 based Dhaka. The club was took part in the 2019–20 Bangladesh Women's Football League which resumed after seven years the country top division women's soccer league. They club have played debut match against Bashundhara Kings Women which defeated by 12–0 goals. The was finished the league at fifth position of 7 participants.

Current squad

BWFL performance by year
{| class="wikitable" style="width:50%;text-align:center"
|-
!width=10|Years
!width=10|Played
!width=10|Won
!width=10|Draw
!width=10|Loss
!width=10|Goal For
!width=10|Goal Against 
|-
|2019–20
| 12 || 4 || 0|| 8 ||13||38 
|-
|2020–21||colspan=8|Did not participate
|-
|2021–22||colspan=8|Did not participate|-
| Overall
| 12 || 4 || 0 || 8||13||38
|}

Top goalscorers by season

Head coach records

Current technical staffAs of February 2021''

References

2020 establishments in Bangladesh
Women's football clubs in Bangladesh
Sport in Comilla
Organisations based in Dhaka